David Matthews (born 20 November 1965) is an English former footballer who played as a forward.

Career
Matthews began his career at West Ham United, signing his first professional deal with the club on 29 November 1982. Matthews failed to break into the first team at West Ham, making 56 appearances for the reserves, scoring eleven times, over the course of four seasons. Following his time at West Ham, Matthews dropped into non-League football, signing for Basildon United. In November 1987, Walsall signed Matthews. Failing to make an appearance for Walsall, Matthews returned back down south, signing for Southend United in March 1988. At Southend, Matthews made six Football League appearances.

Following his time at Southend, Matthews returned to non-league, signing for Dagenham. Matthews later played for Purfleet, Billericay Town, East Thurrock United, Heybridge Swifts and Chelmsford City.

References

1965 births
Living people
Association football forwards
English footballers
Footballers from Hackney, London
West Ham United F.C. players
Basildon United F.C. players
Walsall F.C. players
Southend United F.C. players
Dagenham F.C. players
Thurrock F.C. players
Billericay Town F.C. players
East Thurrock United F.C. players
Heybridge Swifts F.C. players
Chelmsford City F.C. players
English Football League players